The silver antimonide mineral dyscrasite has the chemical formula Ag3Sb. It is an opaque, silver white, metallic mineral which crystallizes in the orthorhombic crystal system.

Crystallography and properties
Dyscrasite is a metal ore and is opaque. In reflected light, however, it demonstrates weak anisotropism. Dyscrasite’s color under plane polarized light is most likely dark grey/black. When spun on a rotatable stage of a microscope (under plane polarized light), dyscrasite’s color should slightly change shades. This property is called pleochroism. Dyscrasite exhibits very weak reflected light pleochroism.

Dyscrasite belongs to the orthorhombic crystal class, meaning all three of its axes (a, b, and c) are unequal in length and are 90° to each other.

Discovery and occurrence
It was first described for an occurrence in 1797 in the Wenzel Mine, Black Forest, Germany. The name dyscrasite comes from the Greek word δυσκράσις, meaning "a bad alloy."

It occurs as a hydrothermal mineral in silver bearing veins in association with native silver, pyrargyrite, acanthite, stromeyerite, tetrahedrite, allemontite, galena, calcite and baryte.

See also

 Classification of minerals
 List of minerals

References 

Antimonide minerals
Silver minerals
Orthorhombic minerals
Minerals in space group 25